The  Secular Democratic Forces (SDF) is an opposition front and an electoral understanding of secular political parties in Tripura, India consisting of the Left Front (Tripura) and the Indian National Congress formed before the 2023 Tripura Legislative Assembly election with the objective of defeating the incumbent Bharatiya Janata Party in the upcoming elections. The main parties in this coalition are the Communist Party of India (Marxist) and the Indian National Congress along with other minor parties in the Left Front (Tripura). The front failed to win the elections and meet their objective.

Current members

References

Political party alliances
2023 in Indian politics
2020s in India